Oncis is an unavailable name for the genus Platevindex, a group of shell-less marine pulmonate gastropod mollusks in the family Onchidiidae.

References

Onchidiidae